The 1931 World Table Tennis Championships mixed doubles was the fifth edition of the mixed doubles championship.  

Miklós Szabados and Mária Mednyánszky defeated Viktor Barna and Anna Sipos in the final by three sets to one.

Results

See also
List of World Table Tennis Championships medalists

References

-